Hierodula majuscula is a species of praying mantis in the genus Hierodula. It is also known as the giant rainforest mantis and the Australian giant mantis. It is found in coastal northern Australia, usually in rainforest and adjacent habitats. This species is typically green although a less common bright yellow form does occur.

Diet
It is predominantly a predator of insects including phasmids, grasshoppers, crickets, flies and other mantids. It also feeds on other invertebrate predators such as spiders and occasionally small vertebrates like geckos, frogs, and juvenile snakes.

Description 
This is the largest species of Australian mantids. Size is 70–110 mm in total length from eye to wing. It is one of the largest mantis species in the world. The specific epithet "majuscula" means large in Latin.

Gallery

See also
List of mantis genera and species

References

External links 
 Rainforest Mantid (Hierodula majuscula) on museumvictoria.com.au

majuscula
Mantodea of Oceania
Insects of Australia
Insects described in 1923